Mohammed Muftawu (born November 17, 1978) is a former Ghanaian footballer who last played for Vatansport Bad Homburg.

Career
Muftawu has spent much of his career in Germany and made six appearances for FSV Mainz 05 in the 2. Bundesliga between 2001 and 2003.

International 
He has represented Ghana at youth level, and was part of the team that reached the final of the 1993 Under-17 World Championship.

Notes

1978 births
Living people
Ghanaian footballers
1. FSV Mainz 05 players
FSV Frankfurt players
FC 08 Homburg players
Viktoria Aschaffenburg players
Association football defenders